Ye Jianchun (born July 1965) is a Chinese engineer and politician who is the current governor of Jiangxi, in office since 21 October 2021. Previously he served as vice minister of Emergency Management and vice minister of Water Resources.

Biography
Ye was born in Zhouning County, Fujian, in July 1965. In 1980, he enrolled in East China Water Conservancy Institute (now Hohai University), majoring in water conservancy and hydropower engineering construction, where he graduated in 1984. 

In August 1984, he was appointed as an official in Shanghai Survey, Design and Research Institute and over a period of 19 years worked his way up to the position of president. He joined the Communist Party of China (CPC) in December 1985.

Beginning in June 2005, he served in several posts in the Ministry of Water Resources, including director of Taihu Lake Basin Authority (2005–2016), director of Finance Division (2016–2017), and vice minister (2017–2021). He also served as secretary-general of State Flood Control and Drought Relief Headquarters from 2017 to 2020 and vice minister of Emergency Management from 2018 to 2020.

In February 2021, he was transferred to central China's Jiangxi province and appointed deputy party secretary. In October 2021, he took office as party branch secretary of Jiangxi, becoming the youngest head of the provincial administrative region government in China. On October 21, he was made acting governor of Jiangxi.

References

1965 births
Living people
People from Zhouning County
Hohai University alumni
People's Republic of China politicians from Fujian
Chinese Communist Party politicians from Fujian
Governors of Jiangxi